Street Sects is an American experimental band from Austin, Texas formed in 2013, composed of vocalist Leo Ashline and multi-instrumentalist Shaun Ringsmuth. Their style is extremely abrasive, characterised by industrial rhythms, use of screamed vocals, samples of both noise and synthesizers, and nihilistic lyrics. Following two EPs released in 2014, the duo's debut album End Position came out on September 16, 2016, on The Flenser to generally positive reviews.

History 
In 2013, in the wake of struggling with addiction for thirteen years, vocalist Leo Ashline formed Street Sects with his friend, multi-instrumentalist Shaun Ringsmuth, in order to produce extreme, experimental music addressing the negative aspects of life. In 2014, they self-released the first two EPs for the planned Gentrification: A Serial Album pentalogy: The Morning After the Night We Raped Death (February 4) and Broken Windows, Sunken Ceilings (July 15). On November 18 they also released the song "Things Will Be Better in California" which is a composition built from Spill/Fill, a collection of samples by Wreck and Reference from their 2014 album Want. All of these works were produced by the duo, mastered by James Plotkin, and illustrated by A.J. Garces Bohmer based on concepts by Ashline.

Street Sects' debut studio album End Position was released on September 16, 2016, through The Flenser to generally positive reviews. It was mixed and mastered by Machines with Magnets in Providence, Rhode Island. The album's title is based on a lyric from I See a Darkness by Will Oldham.

Musical style 
On their Bandcamp, Street Sects place their work within the categories of electronic, noise, punk, hardcore, industrial, sample-based, power electronics and rock. Their label, The Flenser, described their music as "a feverish marriage between industrial music and punk rock" ... "utilizing frantic, uncompromising rhythms and a variety of nightmarish samples". Their style was addressed by various critics in reviews of End Position, which were generally positive. Adam Devlin of Tiny Mix Tapes described it as a harsh noise industrial hammer punk album", noting that "Shaun Ringsmuth is an aural sculptor of rare form, mixing industrial rhythms made of machine gun parts and bursting crash cymbals with psychedelic, transgressive melodies of alien origin". Rolling Stone recommended the duo to fans of Big Black, Youth Code and Agoraphobic Nosebleed, describing their music as a "lean, murderous blend of synths, samples, pained vocals and industrial rhythms" featuring "nightmarish noise, punk and industrial punchouts". Tristan Jones of Sputnikmusic wrote: "Street Sects combine dirty synths with traces of noisecore and industrial piss, underscored with thoughts of suicide and misanthropy." Dæv Tremblay of Can This Even Be Called Music? called their music "hardcore plunderphonics". Stephen Proski of New Noise Magazine praised the interplay between Ringsmuth's sophisticated musical structures and Leo Ashline's (screamed) vocals, which he called "intimate and vehement".

Members 
Leo Ashline – vocals, production (2013–present)
Shaun Ringsmuth – instruments, samples, production (2013–present)
Michael Lauden – guitar, drums, production (2019)

Discography 
Studio albums

EPs
Gentrification I: The Morning After the Night We Raped Death (2014)
Gentrification II: Broken Windows, Sunken Ceilings (2014)
Rat Jacket (2017)
Gentrification III: Death and Displacement (2019)
Gentrification IV: Suspended from Gallery Rails (2019)
Gentrification V: Whitewashed (2022)
 
Splits
Street Sects / Portrayal of Guilt (2018)
Street Sects / Curse (2018)

Singles
"Things Will Be Better in California" (2014)
"And I Grew Into Ribbons" (2016)
"Featherweight Hate" (2016)
"Blacken the Other Eye" (2017)
"Things Will Be Better In Hell" (2018)
"In For a World of Hurt" (2018)
"Still Between Lovers" (2018)
"The Drifter" (2018)
"Fourteen Frames" (featuring Nick Sadler & LINGUA IGNOTA) (2019)

References

External links 
Street Sects on Bandcamp

American industrial music groups
Electronic music groups from Texas
Electronic music duos
American noise rock music groups
Noise musical groups
American experimental rock groups
Hardcore punk groups from Texas
Punk rock groups from Texas
Rock music duos
Musical groups from Austin, Texas
2013 establishments in Texas
Musical groups established in 2013